Live in Las Vegas or Live in Vegas may refer to:

Family Guy: Live in Vegas
Live in Las Vegas (Macy Gray album)
Live in Las Vegas (Al Jardine album)
Tom Jones Live in Las Vegas, 1969 live album by Tom Jones
Live in Las Vegas (Dave Matthews & Tim Reynolds album)
Live in Las Vegas (Elvis Presley album)
Live in Las Vegas, NV by Jimmy Buffett 
Phish: Live in Vegas

See also
Live at The Venetian – Las Vegas by the Blue Man Group
Live from Las Vegas (disambiguation)